Pseudocalotes drogon , Drogon’s false garden lizard, is a species of agamid lizard.

References

Quah
Pseudocalotes
Reptiles of Malaysia
Reptiles described in 2016
Taxa named by Larry Lee Grismer
Taxa named by Perry L. Wood
Taxa named by Shahrul Anuar
Taxa named by Mohd Abdul Muin
Taxa named by Jesse L. Grismer
Taxa named by Michael Cota